Oregus is a genus of beetles in the family Carabidae that is endemic to New Zealand. A 2003 taxonomic revision of the group using both morphological and DNA characters concluded that it contained four species, and identified new species from Marlborough (Oregus spetentionalis) and North Canterbury (Oregus crypticus). The current species list is:

 Oregus aereus (White, 1846)
 Oregus crypticus Pawson, Emberson, Armstrong & Paterson, 2003
 Oregus inaequalis (Castelnau, 1867)
 Oregus septentrionalis  Pawson, Emberson, Armstrong & Paterson, 2003

References

Nothobroscina
Beetles of New Zealand
Endemic fauna of New Zealand
Carabidae genera
Endemic insects of New Zealand